Shawn Fitzgerald Joseph McCoulsky (born 6 January 1997) is a professional footballer who plays as a forward for Maidenhead United.

McCoulsky began his career with non-league side Dulwich Hamlet, and featured for Walton Casuals on loan in January 2015. After a move to Bristol City in November 2015, he spent time in the Under-23s before loan spells with Weston-super-Mare, Torquay United, Bath City, Newport County and Southend United. He made his professional debut in the EFL Cup in October 2016. He joined Forest Green Rovers in January 2019 and had two further loan spells at Bromley and Halifax Town. He joined Colchester United in 2021 following his release from Forest Green.

Career

Dulwich Hamlet 
McCoulsky began his career with the Aspire Academy, the youth section of Isthmian Premier Division club Dulwich Hamlet responsible for the development of George Elokobi and Simeon Jackson. He was called up to the club’s first team ahead of the 2014–15 season.

On 13 September 2014, McCoulsky came off the bench to make his debut in a 3–0 defeat to Worthing. His second appearance for the club saw him claim an assist and the Man of the Match award, before scoring his first goal in a 2–0 victory over AFC Hornchurch the following game.

Walton Casuals (loan) 
On 7 January 2015, he joined Isthmian Division One South outfit Walton Casuals on a one-month loan. Making six appearances for the Stags, he scored in his final game to complete a 3–1 victory over Whitstable Town.

Bristol City 
At the end of the season, McCoulsky was invited to train with recently relegated Millwall, and also attracted interest from Premier League duo West Ham United and Southampton.

In October 2015, he went on trial with Bristol City and scored for the Under-21s. On 2 November, McCoulsky signed a professional contract with the Championship club and spent the season playing for the Under-23s.

On 25 October 2016, McCoulsky made his professional debut for Bristol City, coming off the bench to replace Gustav Engvall in a 2–1 EFL Cup defeat to Hull City.

Weston-super-Mare (loan) 
On 4 August 2016, McCoulsky joined Weston-super-Mare on a two-month loan. Making his debut in a 3–1 win over Whitehawk, he scored the final goal and was named Man of the Match. He went on to score seven times in 12 appearances for the National League South side before returning to Bristol City in late October.

Torquay United (loan) 
On 17 November 2016, he joined National League side Torquay United on a two-month loan. After just two substitute appearances in two months, McCoulsky was recalled by his parent club in January.

Bath City (loan) 
On 3 February 2017, McCoulsky joined Bath City on loan for the remainder of the season. He scored his first goal for the club on 18 February in a 4–1 victory at St Albans City, and went on to score eight times for the National League South club.

McCoulsky was recalled in April ahead of a potential involvement in Bristol City's final league games of the season, but did not feature for the first team.

Newport County (loan) 
On 28 July 2017, McCoulsky joined League Two side Newport County on a six-month loan. He made his debut for Newport on the opening day of the 2017–18 season, scoring an injury-time equaliser during a 3–3 draw with Stevenage. On 4 November 2017 McCoulsky scored the winning goal for Newport in the 2-1 FA Cup second round win against League One club Walsall. On 7 January 2018, he scored the winning goal in a 2–1 win over Championship club Leeds United in the third round of the FA Cup with an 89th minute header.

Southend United (loan)
On 10 August 2018, McCoulsky joined League One side Southend United on a season-long loan deal. McCoulsky scored on  his debut for Southend in a 4–2 defeat to Championship side Brentford in the first round of the EFL Cup.

Forest Green Rovers
On 3 January 2019, McCoulsky signed for League Two outfit Forest Green Rovers on a two and-a half year deal, following his loan recall back to Bristol City.

Bromley (loan)
On 19 August 2019, McCoulsky joined National League side Bromley on a month's loan.

Halifax Town (loan)
On 5 December 2019, McCoulsky joined National League side Halifax Town on a month's loan.

Colchester United
Following his release from Forest Green, McCoulsky signed a short-term deal with Rovers' League Two rivals Colchester United on 30 October 2021. He made his debut from the bench in Colchester's 4–0 FA Cup first round win against AFC Sudbury on 5 November, scoring the U's fourth goal in the third minute of stoppage time. On 3 January 2022, it was confirmed that McCoulsky had left the club following the end of his short-term contract.

Maidenhead United
On 25 January 2022, McCoulsky joined National League side Maidenhead United on a short-term deal until the end of the 2021–22 season.

Career statistics

References

External links 

1997 births
Living people
Footballers from Lewisham
Association football forwards
Dulwich Hamlet F.C. players
Walton Casuals F.C. players
Bristol City F.C. players
Weston-super-Mare A.F.C. players
Torquay United F.C. players
Bath City F.C. players
Newport County A.F.C. players
Southend United F.C. players
Forest Green Rovers F.C. players
Bromley F.C. players
FC Halifax Town players
Colchester United F.C. players
Maidenhead United F.C. players
National League (English football) players
English Football League players
Isthmian League players
English footballers
Black British sportspeople